Small is an English and Scottish surname, and it derives from the Old Norse Smålig meaning someone who is narrow or thin. Notable people with the surname include:

 A. Francis Small
 Albion Woodbury Small (1854–1926), founded the first Department of Sociology in the United States at the University of Chicago
 Ambrose Small (1863 vanished 1919), Canadian theatre magnate
 Anthony Small (born 1981), British ex-boxing champion and Islamic political activist also known as Abdul Haq
 Archie Small (born 1889), English footballer with Southampton
 Bertrice Small (1937–2015), American writer of historical and erotic romance novels
 Brendon Small (born 1975), American actor, composer, and musician
 Bruce Small (1895–1980), Australian businessman and politician
 Charles A. Small, Director of The Yale Initiative for the Interdisciplinary Study of Antisemitism
 Charlotte Small (1785–1857), Métis wife of explorer David Thompson
 Chris Small (born 1973), Scottish professional snooker player
 Drink Small (born 1933), American blues guitarist, pianist, singer, and songwriter
 Edward Small (1891–1977), American film producer
 Elisha Small (died 1842), American sailor
 Ernest Gregor Small (1888–1944), American admiral
 Ethan Small (born 1997), American baseball player
 Frank Small, Jr. (1896–1973), represented the fifth district of the state of Maryland in the United States House of Representatives
 Fred Small (born 1952), American singer-songwriter
 Gladstone Small (born 1961), former England cricketer
 Heather Small (born 1965), British soul singer
 Henry Small (footballer) (1881–1946), English footballer with Southampton and Manchester United
 Henry Small (singer) (born 1948), Canadian singer
 Jack Small (1765–1836), English cricketer
 Jack Small (footballer) (1889–1946), English footballer with Sunderland and Southampton
 James Edward Small (1798–1869), lawyer, judge and political figure in Canada
 James Small (inventor) (1730–1793)
 James Small (rugby player) (1969–2019), South African rugby union footballer
 John Kunkel Small (1869–1938), American botanist
 John Small (British Army officer)  (1726–1796)
 John Small (cricketer) (1737–1826), English cricketer
 John Small (Canadian politician, born 1746) (1746–1841), political figure in Upper Canada
 Joe Small (cricketer) (1892–1958), West Indian cricketer
 Len Small (1862–1936), Republican governor of Illinois
 Marty Small Sr. (born 1974), American politician
 Mews Small (born 1942), American actress
 Michael Small (1939–2003), American film score composer
 Millie Small (1947–2020), Jamaican singer born Millicent Dolly May Small
 Milton Small, (born 1964), former West Indian cricketer
 Pauline Small (1924–2005), American Crow Indian leader
 Phil Small (born 1954), Australian bassist
 Richard H. Small (born 1935), American scientist, responsible for creating the algorithms for calculating loudspeaker cabinets together with Albert Neville Thiele (Thiele/Small parameter)
 Sami Jo Small (born 1976), women's ice hockey player
 Sharon Small (born 1967), Scottish actress
 Sherrod Small, comedian
 Taylor Small, American politician
 Viro Small (born 1854), catch wrestler and boxer of African descent
 Willard Stanton Small (1870–1943), experimental psychologist
 Wade Small (born 1984), footballer
 William Small (1734–1775)
 William Small (Scottish politician) (1909–1978)
 Wilson Small (1810–1886), New York politician, businessman and civil servant

Fictional characters

 Diogenes Small, in the Inspector Morse series of books
 Leon Small, from the BBC soap opera EastEnders

See also
 Smalls (surname)
 Smallman

English-language surnames